Mette-Marit, Crown Princess of Norway (born Mette-Marit Tjessem Høiby, on 19 August 1973) is the wife of Crown Prince Haakon. Haakon is the heir apparent to the throne, which means that should he ascend to the throne, she will automatically become Queen consort of Norway.

A Norwegian commoner and single mother with a disadvantaged past, she was a controversial figure at the time of her engagement to Haakon in 2000. She became Crown Princess of Norway upon her marriage in 2001. The couple have two children, Ingrid Alexandra and Sverre Magnus, who are second and third in line to the Norwegian throne respectively.

In October 2018, she was diagnosed with a form of pulmonary fibrosis. She is being treated at Oslo University Hospital and has restricted her royal duties.

Background and education
Mette-Marit Tjessem Høiby was born in Kristiansand in the southern part of Norway, the daughter of Sven O. Høiby, who had been unemployed for some time but who had previously worked as a journalist for a local paper, and Marit Tjessem, a former bank clerk. Her parents divorced, and her father later married professional stripper Renate Barsgård. She has a sister and two older brothers, including Per Høiby, chief executive of the PR agency First House. Her half-brother, Trond Berntsen, by her mother's 1994 marriage to Rolf Berntsen, died in the 2011 Norway attacks. Mette-Marit grew up in Kristiansand, spending many weekends and holidays in the nearby valley of Setesdal and on the coast, where she learned to sail. During her youth, she was active in the local Slettheia youth club, where she was also an activity leader. As a teenager, she played volleyball, qualifying as a referee and coach.

After starting at Oddernes upper secondary school in Kristiansand, Mette-Marit spent six months at Wangaratta High School located in North East Victoria in Australia as an exchange student with the exchange organisation, Youth For Understanding. Later, she attended Kristiansand Cathedral School, where she passed her final examinations in 1994. She then spent several months working for the Norwegian-British Chamber of Commerce at Norway House in Cockspur Street, London. When her assignment in London ended, Mette-Marit relocated to Norway.

By her own admission, Mette-Marit experienced a rebellious phase before she met Crown Prince Haakon Magnus. As a part-time student, she took six years, longer than usual, to complete her high school education before going on to take preparatory college courses at Agder College. She then worked on and off as a waitress at the restaurant Café Engebret in Oslo.

In the late 1990s, Mette-Marit attended the Quart Festival, Norway's largest music festival, in her hometown of Kristiansand. She met Crown Prince Haakon at a garden party during the Quart Festival season. Years later, after becoming a single mother she met the prince again at another party related to the festival.

Since becoming crown princess, Mette-Marit has taken several university-level courses. In 2012, she obtained a master's degree in executive management. Most of her ancestors were cotters and small farmers.

Engagement and marriage

When the engagement between Crown Prince Haakon and Mette-Marit was announced, public and media reaction was negative, with many Norwegians being "horrified" and feeling that the Crown Prince's choice of partner was questionable; her lack of education, previous relationships with convicted felons and her socialization in a milieu "where drugs were readily available" were often cited by critics. At the time of their engagement, Mette-Marit was a single mother to a son named Marius Borg Høiby, born 13 January 1997 at Aker Hospital in Oslo from her relationship with convicted felon Morten Borg. Marius Borg Høiby, who holds no title or special role, withdrew from public life in 2017 when he moved to the United States to attend an unspecified college.

Her first official appearance as the intended bride of the Crown Prince was at the Nobel Peace Prize ceremony at Oslo City Hall on 10 December 2000, following the announcement of the couple's engagement on 1 December. At the press conference, Haakon said that he and Mette-Marit had been together for about one year. Haakon gave Mette-Marit the same engagement ring that his grandfather King Olav V and his father King Harald V had given to their fiancées.

The couple married on 25 August 2001 at the Oslo Cathedral. Upon her marriage, she acquired the title, Her Royal Highness the Crown Princess of Norway. They now live outside Oslo at Skaugum estate.

The couple has two children together: Princess Ingrid Alexandra, born 21 January 2004 at The National Hospital in Oslo and Prince Sverre Magnus, born 3 December 2005 at The National Hospital in Oslo.

Public life and further education

During 2002 and 2003, the Crown Princess attended lectures in development studies at the School of Oriental and African Studies at the University of London, apparently without graduating. She was also accepted as an intern at NORAD, the Norwegian government's development organization. The appointment received criticism due to her lack of relevant qualifications.

Mette-Marit attended lectures at the faculties of arts and social sciences at the University of Oslo, but did not graduate.

Crown Princess Mette-Marit is a patron of the Norwegian Red Cross and several other organizations. In 2010, Crown Princess Mette-Marit was named Young Global Leader under the World Economic Forum, and in 2012 she became a member of the international Foundation Board of the Global Shapers Community.

In 2015, Crown Princess Mette-Marit and Kate Roberts, senior vice-president of Population Services International, established Maverick Collective. On 26 April 2017, the Crown Princess was appointed as ambassador for Norwegian literature in the international arena.

Crown Prince Haakon and Crown Princess Mette-Marit established The Crown Prince and Crown Princess's Foundation. The purpose of the foundation is to identify and support projects for young people in Norway with the objective of strengthening youth leadership and integration.

In December 2008, she received the Annual Petter Dass prize, which recognises a person who helps to unite people and God.

In October 2018, she was diagnosed with pulmonary fibrosis, which will limit her official programmes. Mette-Marit, who has dealt with "health challenges on a regular basis" (such as pneumonia, several instances of norovirus, low blood pressure, along with some falls, concussions, a neck injury and a herniated disc), will undergo treatment at Oslo University Hospital.

UNAIDS 
Crown Princess Mette-Marit became a UNAIDS International Goodwill Ambassador in 2006. Her focus as goodwill ambassador is on the empowerment of youth in the AIDS response. The Crown Princess participated in several international AIDS conferences and visited several countries to raise awareness of the work and mission of UNAIDS. She assisting UNAIDS in its activities around youth program and leadership. In later years, her work with UNAIDS expanded to highlighting the role of young women and adolescent girls in the AIDS response.

During 2014 United Nations General Assembly, she emphasized how stigma and discrimination are undermining advances in the AIDS response. The Crown Princess highlighted the opportunities offered by ​social media to empower young people in new areas of advocacy at the youth summit during her visit to Mali. During a visit to Tanzania in April 2016, Crown Princess Mette-Marit said "It is moving to meet mothers who are in good health and caring for children born free from HIV thanks to antiretroviral medicines." She also remarked that it's rewarding to see young skilled people in leadership roles of AIDS response and guiding the country towards an AIDS-free generation. She also opened the Youth Pavilion at XVIII International AIDS Conference.

Controversies

In 2012, she attracted controversy for assisting a Norwegian couple with ties to the royal family in procuring surrogacy services in India, despite that surrogacy is banned in Norway; she was criticized by women's rights groups of participating in human trafficking that exploits women in developing countries. The next year, the practice was also banned in India as a form of human trafficking and harmful to women and children.

In 2019, she attracted controversy for her friendship with the American convicted sex offender Jeffrey Epstein; she met him several times between 2011 and 2013, after his conviction on charges of sex trafficking of minors in 2008 and release from prison. Crown Prince Haakon also met Epstein during one of these occasions while the couple were on a holiday in Saint Barthélemy. Her friendship with Epstein was revealed by Norwegian media in the context of the scandal involving Prince Andrew, Duke of York, who in that year resigned from all public roles over his longstanding ties to Epstein and allegations of sexual abuse. In a statement, Mette-Marit spoke of her regret in failing to investigate Epstein's past. The Royal Palace's communications manager Guri Varpe stated that the Crown Princess ceased contact with Epstein as he was attempting to use his connection to her to "influence other people."

Titles, styles and honours

Titles

19 August 1973 – 25 August 2001: Miss Mette-Marit Tjessem Høiby
25 August 2001 – present: Her Royal Highness The Crown Princess of Norway

Mette-Marit has been Crown Princess of Norway since her marriage.

Arms

Honours and medals

National honours and medals
 : Knight Grand Cross with Collar of the Order of Saint Olav
 : Dame of the Royal Family Decoration of King Harald V
 : Recipient of the Medal of the 100th Anniversary of the Birth of King Olav V
 : Recipient of the Royal House Centenary Medal
 : Recipient of the King Harald V Silver Jubilee Medal

Foreign honours
 : Grand Decoration of Honour in Gold with Sash of the Order of Honour for Services to the Republic of Austria
 : Grand Cross of the Order of the Southern Cross
 : Grand Cross of the Order of the Balkan Mountains
 : Knight of the Order of the Elephant
 : Member 1st Class of the Order of the Cross of Terra Mariana
 : Member 1st Class of the Order of the White Star
 : Commander Grand Cross of the Order of the White Rose
 : Grand Cross 1st Class of the Order of Merit of the Federal Republic of Germany
 : Grand Cross of the Order of the Falcon
 : Grand Cross of the Order of Merit of the Italian Republic
 : Paulownia Dame Grand Cordon of the Order of the Precious Crown
 : Grand Cross of the Order of Vytautas the Great
 : Dame Grand Cross of the Order of Adolphe of Nassau
 : Dame Grand Cross of the Order of Orange-Nassau
 : Recipient of the King Willem-Alexander Inauguration Medal
 : Grand Cross of the Order of Merit of the Republic of Poland
 : Grand Cross of the Order of Infante Henry
 : Dame Grand Cross of the Order of Isabella the Catholic
 : Commander Grand Cross of the Royal Order of the Polar Star

References

External links

Official biography in English

Norwegian princesses
Norwegian Christians
People educated at Kristiansand Cathedral School
Alumni of SOAS University of London
1973 births
Living people
People from Kristiansand
House of Glücksburg (Norway)
Crown Princesses of Norway
Princesses by marriage

Recipients of the Decoration for Services to the Republic of Austria
Recipients of the Grand Decoration with Sash for Services to the Republic of Austria
Recipients of the Order of the Cross of Terra Mariana, 1st Class
Recipients of the Order of the White Star, 1st Class
Grand Crosses Special Class of the Order of Merit of the Federal Republic of Germany
Recipients of the Order of the Falcon
Knights Grand Cross of the Order of the Falcon
Recipients of the Order of Merit of the Italian Republic
Knights Grand Cross of the Order of Merit of the Italian Republic
Order of the Precious Crown members
Grand Cordons of the Order of the Precious Crown
Recipients of the Cross of Recognition
Recipients of the Order of Vytautas the Great
Grand Crosses of the Order of Vytautas the Great
Recipients of the Order of Orange-Nassau
Knights Grand Cross of the Order of Orange-Nassau
Recipients of the Order of Merit of the Republic of Poland
Grand Crosses of the Order of Merit of the Republic of Poland
Recipients of the Order of Prince Henry
Grand Crosses of the Order of Prince Henry
Recipients of the Order of Isabella the Catholic
Dames Grand Cross of the Order of Isabella the Catholic
Commanders Grand Cross of the Order of the Polar Star
Controversies in Norway